Shambala Animal Kingdom was a  zoological park outside Kuranda, Queensland, Australia. The park was privately owned. It was formerly known as "Cairns Wildlife Safari Reserve", "Mareeba Wild Animal Park" and "Out of Africa Reserve". After being purchased by a Sydney lawyer, the zoo was renamed "Shambala Animal Kingdom". The zoo was closed in April 2013 citing financial reasons.

The park maintained a collection of both exotic and native animals. Most exotic animals were transferred to Indonesian wildlife parks.

History

The zoo was originally opened by David Gill in 2003 (who owns South Lakes Safari Zoo in England) as the Mareeba Wild Animal Park. It was closed by involuntary liquidation in 2004 after delays in obtaining permits to move animals from Tipperary Station in the Northern Territory and David Gill returned to England. Zoo consultants were hired by the zoos administrators. In September 2006 Udo and Jenny Jattke purchased the zoo and spent $100,000 upgrading the facility. It re-opened in September 2006 as Cairns Wildlife Safari Reserve. Many of the volunteers were offered keeper positions by the new owners.. The zoo was sold in 2012 and changed its name from Cairns Wildlife Safari Reserve to Shambala Animal Kingdom. The zoo closed in 2013 after a number of failed attempts to sell as a zoo and subsequently the land and animals were sold separately.

Main attractions
The park maintained a large lion pride, primates, and rhinoceros among other animals. It had a number of behind the scenes encounters and tours.

Animals

Carnivores
 Asian small-clawed otter
 Bengal tiger
 Cheetah
 Lion
 Serval
 Sumatran tiger
 Syrian brown bear

Ungulates
 Alpaca
 Chital deer
 Hippo
 Pygmy hippo
 Rusa deer
 White rhino

Primates
 Japanese macaque
 Ring-tailed lemur
 Siamang gibbon
 Sulawesi macaque
 Black-handed spider monkey

Birds
 Galah
 Ostrich

Reptiles
 Bearded dragon
 Blue-tongued skink
 Day gecko
 Green iguana
 Saw-shelled turtle
 Woma python

Conservation

The zoo sent lions to other areas of Australia to participate in breeding programs.

In 2007, the park negotiated with Sea World in Gold Coast, Queensland to populate Sea World's new hippo exhibit.

In 2008 the zoo started its Sumatran tiger breeding program in line with recommendations from the Zoo and Aquarium Association (ZAA). The zoo's resident male tiger and a female on loan from Perth were paired together. In 2009 the female gave birth to a cub on 13 December, the cub died only 17 days later from severe gastroenteritis.

In March 2009 the park welcomed two Asian small-clawed otter's from UnderWater World at Mooloolaba.

In November 2009 the park was granted Full Institutional membership by the Zoo and Aquarium Association (ZAA). It is one of only three zoo's in Queensland to obtain ZAA accreditation. Since 2012 this membership has been cancelled by the Zoo Aquarium Association.

In March 2010 the zoos only siamang was joined by two males from Melbourne Zoo.

Incidents
In September 2006 an adult male African lion escaped its enclosure through a break in the fence. Tim Husband, the zoo curator at the time, secured the animal in a holding area until vets arrived to tranquillise it and return it to its enclosure.

In May 2010 it surfaced that staff at the zoo were going without pay and had been on pay cuts for around six weeks to ensure the animals did not go hungry. Staff complained to a local newspaper about the issues.

In March 2012 Shambala Animal Kingdom was removed as a member from the Zoo Aquarium Association for unknown reasons.

In April 2013 the zoo closed its doors after dispersing its collection.

References

External links
 

2003 establishments in Australia
Zoos established in 2003
Zoos in Queensland
Parks in Queensland
Tourist attractions in Far North Queensland